Adam Zbar is a Webby Award-winning Bay Area entrepreneur who is CEO of Sun Basket, a San Francisco-based organic meal kit delivery company, which he co-founded with Chef Justine Kelly.  Previously Zbar founded social analytics company Tap11, and same day food delivery service Lasso, which closed when he launched Sun Basket.  He was also formerly CEO of micro-blogging service Zannel.

Early life and education 

Zbar was born in 1969 in Washington D.C. His father, Dr. Bert Zbar, is a cancer scientist at the National Cancer Institute, who along with Dr. Marston Linehan discovered 4 genes related to hereditary kidney cancer. His mother, Dr. Michell Lynn Arnow, is a practicing psychologist. His grandfather, George Hatch, was an entrepreneur, communications, and cable pioneer, including co-founding Tele-Communications (TCI) which became a major cable television provider in the United States.

Zbar studied economics at Pomona College and received his MFA in Film Production from UCLA’s School of Theater, Film, & Television.

Career 
Zbar started his career in management consulting at McKinsey & Company in Los Angeles, where he worked from 1991 to 1993.  He then worked as VP of Business Development at kpe, part of Agency.com, a digital media company based in Los Angeles, where his team built some of the early websites for Warner Home Video, Six Flags, and Mandalay Resort Group. In 2001, Zbar moved to Silicon Valley where he worked as a technology executive for post-bubble online and mobile companies. During this period, he ran a $100M online hotel booking business at WorldRes, and developed next generation mobile media applications at Moviso/Infospace.

Zannel
In 2005, Zbar along with co-founder Braxton Woodham, raised $6M in venture capital from US Venture Partners (USVP) for his first start-up, Zannel. Zannel was a real-time, multi-media microblogging platform which won a Webby in 2008 for best mobile social network. In 2008, Zbar raised $10M for Zannel’s Series B.

Tap11
In 2009, Adam Zbar along with Braxton Woodham launched their second company, Tap11, a real-time Twitter business analytics platform. Tap11 was the first social analytics firm to store and index Twitter's then 140 million tweets per day. In 2011, Zbar sold both Tap11 and Zannel to AVOS Systems, led by the founders of YouTube, Chad Hurley and Steve Chen.

Lasso 
In 2012, Zbar raised $1.7M in seed funding from Baseline Ventures and Pivot North Capital, and in 2013 launched Lasso, a same day on-demand wine and cheese food delivery service.

Sun Basket

Later in 2014, Zbar realized that a healthy food delivery service was a much bigger market than wine delivery, and he pivoted the business to become Sun Basket, which ships organic and sustainable ingredients and recipes to customers, allowing them to make their own meals. The company launched in beta in March 2015.

Zbar led several funding rounds for the company, including one by food giant Unilever's venture capital arm, Unilever Ventures.

Personal
Zbar is an avid fitness buff. When not working, he spends time outdoors, skiing, surfing, and running, having run three marathons in his 30s.

References

American chief executives of food industry companies
Living people
Businesspeople from the San Francisco Bay Area
1969 births
Pomona College alumni